Old Pulteney distillery is a malt whisky production and aging facility in the Pulteneytown area of Wick, Caithness, in the Highland area of Scotland. The distillery produces the Old Pulteney single malt whisky at a number of ages and has a visitor centre in Huddart Street.

History
The distillery was established in 1826 in the name of Sir William Pulteney (who died in 1805), and after whom Pulteneytown is named. The distillery was the most northerly on the Scottish mainland (the honour has been usurped by Wolfburn Distillery near Thurso) and was quite inaccessible, except by sea, when established. Barley was brought in by sea, and the whisky was shipped out the same way. Many of the distillery workers were also employed as fishermen. The herring fishing industry is no longer part of daily life in Wick but the distillery continues to operate, producing a Highland single malt with a reputation as one of the finest available. Characteristics of the whisky are attributed to exposure to sea air during maturation.

The distillery closed in 1930 due to declining trade after the local parish enforced prohibition laws but re-opened in 1951 when the vote was rescinded after the law was abolished.
It is now owned by Inver House Distillers.

The Pulteney site uses water from an old mill lade, constructed by Thomas Telford. This stream flows out of Loch Hempriggs, 3 or 4 kilometres (2 miles) to the south/southwest, and is reputed to have powered a barley mill at or near the site of the distillery.

Awards

Old Pulteney 12 Years Old

International Spirits Challenge 2021 - 94 Points

San Francisco World Spirits Competition 2020 - Silver

International Wine & Spirits Competition 2019 - Gold - 95pts

International Spirits Challenge 2019 - Silver

Whisky Masters 2019 - Gold

International Wine and Spirit Competition 2018 - Silver Outstanding

International Spirits Challenge 2018 - Silver

Ultimate Spirits Challenge 2018 - 91 points

International Spirits Challenge 2017 – Silver

International Wine and Spirit Competition 2017 - Silver Outstanding

International Spirits Challenge 2016 - Silver

International Wine and Spirit Competition 2016 - Silver Outstanding

Old Pulteney Huddart

San Francisco World Spirits Competition 2020 - Silver

International Spirits Competition 2019 - Silver

World Whiskies Awards 2019 - Silver

Old Pulteney 15 Years Old

San Francisco World Spirits Competition 2020 – Silver

International Spirits Challenge 2019 – Gold

Whisky Masters 2019 - Gold

Old Pulteney 18 Years Old

San Francisco World Spirits Competition 2020 - Gold

International Spirits Competition 2019 – Silver

Whisky Masters 2019 - Gold

Old Pulteney 25 Years Old

San Francisco World Spirits Competition 2020 - Double Gold

International Spirits Challenge 2019 - Gold

International Spirits Challenge 2018 - Gold

International Wine and Spirit Competition – Gold

Traveller’s Exclusive

Old Pulteney 16 Years Old

International Spirits Challenge 2019 - Silver

Past awards in their collection include:

International Wine & Spirits Challenge 2018

Old Pulteney 2006 Ex-Bourbon - Silver Outstanding

International Wine and Spirit Competition 2017

Old Pulteney 17 Years Old – Silver

International Spirits Challenge 2017 

Old Pulteney 35 Years Old 2nd Release – Silver

Ultimate Spirits Challenge 2017 

Old Pulteney 21 Years Old - 94 points, finalist

Old Pulteney Navigator - 92 points

Old Pulteney Clipper - 91 points

IWSC 2016 

Old Pulteney 21 Years Old – Gold

Old Pulteney 17 Years Old – Silver Outstanding

Old Pulteney Noss Head – Silver Outstanding

Old Pulteney Navigator – Silver

Old Pulteney Duncansby Head - Silver

International Spirits Challenge 2016 

Old Pulteney 21 Years Old – Gold

Old Pulteney 17 Years Old – Silver

Old Pulteney Duncansby Head – Silver

Old Pulteney 35 Years Old 1st Release – Silver

Old Pulteney Dunnet Head - Silver

Ultimate Spirits Challenge 2016 

Old Pulteney Navigator – 92 points

Old Pulteney 17 Years Old – 89 points

World Whiskies Awards 2016

Old Pulteney 1989 - Worlds Best Single Malt 

Old Pulteney 17 Years Old – Silver

San Francisco World Spirits Competition 2016

Old Pulteney Navigator  - Silver

Berlin World Spirits Competition 2016 

Old Pulteney – Highland Scotch Distillery of the Year

Old Pulteney Navigator - Silver

References

External links
 

Distilleries in Scotland
Scottish malt whisky
Wick, Caithness